The William Austin House, at 247 Ontario Ave. in Park City, Utah was built around 1890.  It was listed on the National Register of Historic Places in 1984.

It, among a group of 17 buildings, was deemed "architecturally significant as one of 78 extant T/L cottages in Park City".

References

External links

		
National Register of Historic Places in Summit County, Utah
Houses completed in 1890
1890 establishments in Utah Territory